Kannappa was a staunch devotee of Shiva and is closely associated with Srikalahasteeswara Temple. He was a hunter and is believed to have plucked his eyes to offer to Srikalahasteeswara linga, the presiding deity of Srikalahasti Temple. He is also considered one of the 63 Nayanars or holy Saivite saints, the staunch devotees of Shiva.

Birth and Life
Kannappa Nayanar is a South Indian saint also known as Thinnappan, Dinna, Kannappa, Tinnappan, Dheera, Bhakta Kannappa, Thinnan, Kannappan, Dinnayya, Kannayya, Kannappa Nayanar or Nayanmar, Kannan, Bhakta Kannappan and Dheeran. He was born in a vyadha (hunter) family, the son of Raja Naga Vyadha and his wife in Uduppura (modern Vutukuru) near Sri Kalahasti, in present-day Utukkuru, Rajampet Andhra Pradesh. His father was a notable gerent among their hunting community and a great Shaiva devotee of Sri Kartikeya.  He was named Thinnan or Theeran in tamil by his parents, which is known to Telugu-speakers today as Dinna or Dheera respectively. His wife's name was Neela.

History

When Arjuna was meditating on Lord Siva for Pashupatastra, to test him, Shiva entered that forest as an animal hunter and due to two arrows from Shiva and Arjuna killing a demon named Mooka, a war started between Shiva and Arjuna, a battle took place between both and finally impressed by Arjuna's efforts, Shiva gave him the Pashupatastra. According to a folklore, Lord Shiva also blessed him to be born as his greatest devotee in his next birth. So, he is born again as a devotee in the Kali Yuga as Kannappa Nayanar and finally got liberation.

Kannapa was born as Thinnan and was a staunch devotee of the Vayu Linga of the Srikalahasteeshwarar Temple which he found in the forest while hunting. Being a hunter, he did not know how to properly worship Lord Siva. It is said that he poured water from his mouth on the Siva lingam which he brought from the nearby river Swarnamukhi. He also offered Lord Shiva whatever animal he hunted, including swine flesh. But Lord Siva accepted his offerings since Thinnan was pure at heart and his devotion was true. Once, Lord Siva tested the unshakable devotion of Thinnan. With his divine power, He created a tremor and the roof-tops of the temple began to fall. All the priests ran away from the scene except for Thinnan who covered the linga with his body to prevent it from any damage. Hence he was named thereafter as Theeran (valiant one).

Thinnan noticed that one of the eyes of the Siva linga was oozing blood and tears. Sensing that Lord Shiva's eye had been injured, Thinna proceeded to pluck his one eye out with one of his arrows and placed it in the spot of the bleeding eye of the Siva linga. This stopped the bleeding in that eye of the linga. But to complicate matters further, he noticed that the other eye of the linga has also started oozing blood. So Thinna thought that if he were to pluck his other eye too, he would become blind to exactly know the spot where he has to place his own second eye over the bleeding second eye of the lingam. So he placed his right toe on the linga to mark the spot of the bleeding second eye and proceeded to pluck out his other and only eye. Moved by his extreme devotion, Lord Shiva appeared before Thinnan, stopped him from plucking his only eye and restored both his eyes. He made Thinnan the 10th of the 63 Nayanars and he is referred to as Kannappar or Kannappa Nayanar. Kannappa merged into the lingam along with Lord Siva and attained moksha (liberation) at last.

See also
 Kalahasti Temple
 Bedara Kannappa
 Kalahasti Mahatyam
 Bhakta Kannappa

Bibliography
Bhakta Kannappa Movie in Telugu

References

Shaivam.org: Kannappa Nayanar
Srividya.org: Kannappa Nayanar

Nayanars